General Francisco Higino Lopes Carneiro (born July 8, 1962) is  a member of parliament for the MPLA in Angola. He is, along with fellow "top generals" João Maria de Sousa, Hélder Vieira Dias, Roberto Leal Monteiro, and Kundi Paihama, one of the military leaders holding top ministerial posts for the Popular Movement for the Liberation of Angola, the political party that has ruled Angola since it gained its independence from Portugal in 1975.<ref>http://www.africafiles.org/article.asp?ID=16918 ] "Private security companies and a parallel State in Angola" (africafiles.org)</</ref>

Political life 
He was a key figure in the successful peace negotiations between the Angolan government and the National Union for the Total Independence of Angola (UNITA), including that of Alto Cauango in 1991, which allowed for the gradual pacification of the country.

Carneiro was included on the MPLA's national list in the September 2008 parliamentary election. The MPLA won an overwhelming majority in the National Assembly. Previously, he had been the vice-president of the National Assembly, governor of the provinces of Luanda, Cuando-Cubango and Kwanza Sul. He was also the Minister of Public Works for ten years, from 2002 to 2012.

In February 2019, Carneiro was indicted for financial crimes committed during his tenure as governor of Luanda. These include allegations of corruption, money laundering and breach of trust. Along with another lawmaker, Manuel Rabelais, he is the first former member of government to be prosecuted since Joao Lourenco became Angola’s president in 2017. The General Attorney's Office on 13 February 2020 prohibited Carneiro from leaving the country as long as investigations are ongoing.

Carneiro is also accused of having run a money-laundering scheme through a front company called Agro 88, owned by Swiss art dealer Yves Bouvier. It was reported by local media that Agro 88 was "a front company designed to suck Angola's money".

References

1962 births
Living people
Members of the National Assembly (Angola)
MPLA politicians
Governors of Cuando Cubango
Governors of Cuanza Sul
Governors of Luanda
Construction ministers of Angola
Public Works ministers of Angola